Pediatric Annals is a monthly peer-reviewed medical journal covering diagnosis and treatment of various pediatric diseases and disorders. It was established in 1972 and is published by Slack.

History
The journal was established 1972 with Milton I. Levine as founding editor-in-chief. The current editor-in-chief is Joseph R. Hageman.

Abstracting and indexing
The journal is abstracted and indexed in:

According to the Journal Citation Reports, the journal has a 2017 impact factor of 0.636.

References

External links

Monthly journals
English-language journals
Pediatrics journals
Publications established in 1972